Michael Pärt Musik is an Icelandic-Estonian film music, sound and music production company founded by music producer Michael Pärt. The company is focused on score and soundtrack productions for feature films, TV and documentaries. In addition to producing, Michael Pärt Musik deals with engineering, editing, mixing and a little composing as well.
Some of the highlights of the company include collaborations with film director Francis Ford Coppola, composers Howard Shore, Richard Harvey, Osvaldo Golijov, rock band Arcade Fire and Icelandic pop artist Björk.

Current activities

International Arvo Pärt Centre
In 2008, he returned to Estonia, the homeland of his father and the country where he was born, to establish the International Arvo Pärt Centre which he chairs. The foundation preserves Arvo Pärt's creative contribution to the arts and ensures education for future generations.

Notable projects
 2008 Music Editor, Additional Recording  for Robert Young's feature film Wide Blue Yonder  Composer: Bill Connor
 2008 Orchestra Contractor, Session Producer  for Ellen Kuras's documentary The Betrayal . Composer: Howard Shore
 2007 Score and Soundtrack Production; Session Co-producer, Music Editor  for Daniel Cohen's feature film Les Deux Mondes . Composer: Richard Harvey
 2007 Music Editor, Score Post Production, Producer (OST)  for Francis Ford Coppola's feature film Youth Without Youth . Composer: Osvaldo Golijov
 2007 Associate Producer, Editor  for Osvaldo Golijov's OST for Youth Without Youth
 2007 Assistant, Production, Session Producer, Engineer, Editor  on Björk's album Volta
 2007 Orchestra Contractor, Session Producer  on Arcade Fire's album Neon Bible
 2007 Music Editor  for Robert Young's feature film Eichmann . Composer: Richard Harvey
 2005 Music Production  for Stewart Raffill's feature film Survival Island . Composer: Richard Harvey
 2005 Final Mixer, Editor (Sound/Music/FX/Dialogue/ADR)  on Magnús Scheving's children TV series LazyTown 
 2004 Technical Supervisor, Music Editor  on Brendan Quayles IMAX feature Sacred Journey. Composer: Daryl Griffith
 2003 Music Production  for Manop Udomdej's feature film Keunbab Prompiram Composer: Richard Harvey
 2003 Music Supervisor, Session Producer, Music Editor  for Chatrichalerm Yukol's & Francis Ford Coppola's feature film The Legend of Suriyothai . Composer: Richard Harvey
 2003 Session Producer, Music Editor, Post Production  for Eric Till's feature film Luther . Composer: Richard Harvey
 2003 Music Editor, Engineer, Music Production  for John Henderson's feature film  . Composers: Richard Harvey, Daryl Griffith and Paul Reeves
 2003 Original Music  for Nick Brooks and Laura Kelly's short film Ozone 
 2002 Music Editor  for John Henderson's feature film Two Men Went To War . Composer: Richard Harvey
 2001 Engineer, Editor, Mixer  on alsum "Silk and Bamboo" for "Hucky and Harvey"
 2000 Original Music  for Liivo Niglas' documentary The Brigade 
 2000 Cyclic Evolution

References

External links
 

Film production companies of Iceland
Icelandic film score composers
Estonian record labels